(), also known as Hundred-change skirt, refers to an ancient style of  worn by Han Chinese women in ancient China and is currently worn as a lower garment item in . The  is typically a long, wrap-around densely pleated skirt with two flat surfaces at each end of the skirt.

Construction and design 
The  is made of a single panel of fabric. Its pleats tend to be very narrow and/or dense and almost covers the entire circumference of the skirt, except for the two edges of the skirts which are left non-pleated. It has a wide waist band and long ribbons which are used as ties.

Modern variation 
The modern variation of the  features narrow pleats, which are about one to two centimetres in term of pleat width. There is typically no rule on where the  need to be located on its wearer's body, as such the  can be found at the sides, back, or front depending on its wearer's desire. 

Related content

See also 

 Hanfu
 List of Hanfu
 Kilt

Notes

References

External links 

 Unearthed artifacts of Baidiequn
 Unearthed artifacts of the Baidiequn from the Tomb of Huang Sheng
 Modern-style Baidiequn

Chinese traditional clothing